KUOL (1470 AM) was a radio station broadcasting a Spanish language Christian radio format. Licensed to San Marcos, Texas, United States, it simulcast Radio Cristiana.

The station's license was cancelled by the FCC on November 12, 2013, and the call letters were deleted.

External links

Defunct religious radio stations in the United States
UOL
UOL
Radio stations established in 1983
Radio stations disestablished in 2013
Defunct radio stations in the United States
1983 establishments in Texas
2013 disestablishments in Texas
UOL